The Longing is a 2002 German film directed by Iain Dilthey. It won the Golden Leopard at the 2002 Locarno International Film Festival.

Cast
 Susanne-Marie Wrage: Lena
 Klaus Grünberg: Johannes
 Robert Lohr: Paul
 Heidemarie Rohweder: Martha
 Manfred Kranich: Griesbacher

References

External links
 

2002 films
German drama films
2000s German films